St. Mary's High School is a private, Roman Catholic high school in Remsen, Iowa.  It is located in the Roman Catholic Diocese of Sioux City.

Athletics
The Hawks compete in the following sports in the War Eagle Conference:
Cross Country
Volleyball
Football
 2004, 2020 and 2022 8-player State Champions
Basketball
Wrestling
Track and Field
Golf 
Soccer
Baseball
 7-time State Champions (1980 (fall), 1981 (fall), 1983, 1984, 1984 (fall), 1985, 2016) 
Softball

See also
List of high schools in Iowa

External links
 School Website

Notes and references

Catholic secondary schools in Iowa
Private high schools in Iowa
Schools in Plymouth County, Iowa
Educational institutions established in 1902
1902 establishments in Iowa